In numerical analysis, the interval finite element method (interval FEM) is a finite element method that uses interval parameters. Interval FEM can be applied in situations where it is not possible to get reliable probabilistic characteristics of the structure. This is important in concrete structures, wood structures, geomechanics, composite structures, biomechanics and in many other areas. The goal of the Interval Finite Element is to find upper and lower bounds of different characteristics of the model (e.g. stress, displacements, yield surface etc.) and use these results in the design process. This is so called worst case design, which is closely related to the limit state design.

Worst case design requires less information than probabilistic design however the results are more conservative [Köylüoglu and Elishakoff 1998].

Applications of the interval parameters to the modeling of uncertainty 

Consider the following equation:

Very often, the exact values of the parameters a and b are unknown.

In this case, it is necessary to solve the following equation

There are several definitions of the solution set of this equation with interval parameters.

United solution set 

In this approach the solution is the following set

This is the most popular solution set of the interval equation and this solution set will be applied in this article.

In the multidimensional case the united solutions set is much more complicated.
The solution set of the following system of linear interval equations

is shown on the following picture

The exact solution set is very complicated, thus it is necessary to find the smallest interval which contains the exact solution set

or simply

where

See also

Parametric solution set of interval linear system

The Interval Finite Element Method requires the solution of a parameter-dependent system of equations (usually with a symmetric positive definite matrix.) An example of the solution set of general parameter dependent system of equations

is shown on the picture below.

Algebraic solution 

In this approach x is an interval number for which the equation

is satisfied. In other words, the left side of the equation is equal to the right side of the equation.
In this particular case the solution is  because

If the uncertainty is larger, i.e. , then  because

If the uncertainty is even larger, i.e. , then the solution doesn't exist. It is very complex to find a physical interpretation of the algebraic interval solution set.
Thus, in applications, the united solution set is usually applied.

The method 

Consider the PDE with the interval parameters

where  is a vector of parameters which belong to given intervals

For example, the heat transfer equation

where  are the interval parameters (i.e. ).

Solution of the equation can be defined in the following way

For example, in the case of the heat transfer equation

Solution  is very complicated because of that in practice it is more interesting to find the smallest possible interval which contain the exact solution set .

For example, in the case of the heat transfer equation

Finite element method lead to the following parameter dependent system of algebraic equations

Interval solution can be defined as a multivalued function

In the simplest case above system can be treat as a system of linear interval equations.

It is also possible to define the interval solution as a solution of the following optimization problem

In multidimensional case the interval solution can be written as

Interval solution versus probabilistic solution 

It is important to know that the interval parameters generate different results than uniformly distributed random variables.

Interval parameter  take into account all possible probability distributions (for ).

In order to define the interval parameter it is necessary to know only upper  and lower bound .

Calculations of probabilistic characteristics require the knowledge of a lot of experimental results.

It is possible to show that the sum of n interval numbers is  times wider than the sum of appropriate normally distributed random variables.

Sum of n interval number  is equal to

Width of that interval is equal to

Consider normally distributed random variable X such that

Sum of n normally distributed random variable is a normally distributed random variable with the following characteristics (see Six Sigma)

We can assume that the width of the probabilistic result is equal to 6 sigma (compare Six Sigma).

Now we can compare the width of the interval result and the probabilistic result

Because of that the results of the interval finite element (or in general worst-case analysis) may be overestimated in comparison to the stochastic fem analysis (see also propagation of uncertainty).
However, in the case of nonprobabilistic uncertainty it is not possible to apply pure probabilistic methods.
Because probabilistic characteristic in that case are not known exactly (Elishakoff 2000).

It is possible to consider random (and fuzzy random variables) with the interval parameters (e.g. with the interval mean, variance etc.).
Some researchers use interval (fuzzy) measurements in statistical calculations (e.g. ). As a results of such calculations we will get so called imprecise probability.

Imprecise probability is understood in a very wide sense. It is used as a generic term to cover all mathematical models which measure chance or uncertainty without sharp numerical probabilities. It includes both qualitative (comparative probability, partial preference orderings, ...) and quantitative modes (interval probabilities, belief functions, upper and lower previsions, ...). Imprecise probability models are needed in inference problems where the relevant information is scarce, vague or conflicting, and in decision problems where preferences may also be incomplete .

Simple example: modeling tension, compression, strain, and stress)

1-dimension example 

In the tension-compression problem, the following equation shows the relationship between displacement  and force :

If the Young's modulus and force are uncertain, then

To find upper and lower bounds of the displacement , calculate the following partial derivatives:

Calculate extreme values of the displacement as follows:

Calculate strain using following formula:

Calculate derivative of the strain using derivative from the displacements:

Calculate extreme values of the displacement as follows:

It is also possible to calculate extreme values of strain using the displacements

then

The same methodology can be applied to the stress

then

and

If we treat stress as a function of strain then

then

Structure is safe if stress  is smaller than a given value  i.e.,

this condition is true if

After calculation we know that this relation is satisfied if

The example is very simple but it shows the applications of the interval parameters in mechanics. Interval FEM use very similar methodology in multidimensional cases [Pownuk 2004].

However, in the multidimensional cases relation between the uncertain parameters and the solution is not always monotone. In that cases more complicated optimization methods have to be applied.

Multidimensional example 
In the case of tension-compression problem the equilibrium equation has the following form

In order to get unique solution it is necessary to add appropriate boundary conditions e.g.

For each FEM element it is possible to multiply the equation by the test function 

where 

After integration by parts we will get the equation in the weak form

where 

Let's introduce a set of grid points , where  is a number of elements, and linear shape functions for each FEM element

where 

 left endpoint of the element,  left endpoint of the element number "e".
Approximate solution in the "e"-th element is a linear combination of the shape functions

After substitution to the weak form of the equation we will get the following system of equations

or in the matrix form

In order to assemble the global stiffness matrix it is necessary to consider an equilibrium equations in each node.
After that the equation has the following matrix form

where

is the global stiffness matrix,

is the solution vector,

is the right hand side.

In the case of tension-compression problem

If we neglect the distributed load 

After taking into account the boundary conditions the stiffness matrix has the following form

Right-hand side has the following form

Let's assume that Young's modulus , area of cross-section  and the load  are uncertain and belong to some intervals

The interval solution can be defined calculating the following way

Calculation of the interval vector  is in general NP-hard, however in specific cases it is possible to calculate the solution which can be used in many engineering applications.

The results of the calculations are the interval displacements

Let's assume that the displacements in the column have to be smaller than some given value (due to safety).

The uncertain system is safe if the interval solution satisfy all safety conditions.

In this particular case

or simple

In postprocessing it is possible to calculate the interval stress, the interval strain and the interval limit state functions and use these values in the design process.

The interval finite element method can be applied to the solution of problems in which there is not enough information to create reliable probabilistic characteristic of the structures (Elishakoff 2000). Interval finite element method can be also applied in the theory of imprecise probability.

Endpoints combination method 

It is possible to solve the equation  for all possible combinations of endpoints of the interval . 
Upper and lower bound of the solution can be calculated in the following way

Endpoints combination method gives solution which is usually exact; unfortunately the method has exponential computational complexity and cannot be applied to the problems with many interval parameters.

Taylor expansion method 

The function  can be expanded by using Taylor series.
In the simplest case the Taylor series use only linear approximation

Upper and lower bound of the solution can be calculated by using the following formula

The method is very efficient however it is not very accurate.
In order to improve accuracy it is possible to apply higher order Taylor expansion [Pownuk 2004].
This approach can be also applied in the interval finite difference method and the interval boundary element method.

Gradient method 

If the sign of the derivatives  is constant then the functions  is monotone and the exact solution can be calculated very fast.

if  then 

if  then 

Extreme values of the solution can be calculated in the following way

In many structural engineering applications the method gives exact solution. 
If the solution is not monotone the solution is usually reasonable. In order to improve accuracy of the method it is possible to apply monotonicity tests and higher order sensitivity analysis. The method can be applied to the solution of linear and nonlinear problems of computational mechanics [Pownuk 2004]. Applications of sensitivity analysis method to the solution of civil engineering problems can be found in the following paper [M.V. Rama Rao, A. Pownuk and I. Skalna 2008].
This approach can be also applied in the interval finite difference method and the interval boundary element method.

Element by element method

Muhanna and Mullen applied element by element formulation to the solution of finite element equation with the interval parameters. Using that method it is possible to get the solution with guaranteed accuracy in the case of truss and frame structures.

Perturbation methods
The solution  stiffness matrix  and the load vector  can be expanded by using perturbation theory. Perturbation theory lead to the approximate value of the interval solution. The method is very efficient and can be applied to large problems of computational mechanics.

Response surface method
It is possible to approximate the solution  by using response surface. Then it is possible to use the response surface to the get the interval solution. Using response surface method it is possible to solve very complex problem of computational mechanics.

Pure interval methods
Several authors tried to apply pure interval methods to the solution of finite element problems with the interval parameters. In some cases it is possible to get very interesting results e.g. [Popova, Iankov, Bonev 2008]. However, in general the method generates very overestimated results.

Parametric interval systems
Popova and Skalna introduced the methods for the solution of the system of linear equations in which the coefficients are linear combinations of interval parameters. In this case it is possible to get very accurate solution of the interval equations with guaranteed accuracy.

See also
 Interval boundary element method
 Interval (mathematics)
 Interval arithmetic
 Imprecise probability
 Multivalued function
 Differential inclusion
 Observational error
 Random compact set
 Reliability (statistics)
 Confidence interval
 Best, worst and average case
 Probabilistic design
 Propagation of uncertainty
 Experimental uncertainty analysis
 Sensitivity analysis
 Perturbation theory
 Continuum mechanics
 Solid mechanics
 Truss
 Space frame
 Linear elasticity
 Strength of materials

References

 Dempster, A. P. (1967). "Upper and lower probabilities induced by a multivalued mapping". The Annals of Mathematical Statistics 38 (2): 325–339. . Retrieved 2009-09-23
 Analyzing Uncertainty in Civil Engineering, by W. Fellin, H. Lessmann, M. Oberguggenberger, and R. Vieider (eds.), Springer-Verlag, Berlin, 2005
 I. Elishakoff, Possible limitations of probabilistic methods in engineering. Applied Mechanics Reviews, Vol.53, No.2, pp. 19–25, 2000.
 Hlavácek, I., Chleboun, J., Babuška, I.: Uncertain Input Data Problems and the Worst Scenario Method. Elsevier, Amsterdam (2004)
 Köylüoglu, U., Isaac Elishakoff; A comparison of stochastic and interval finite elements applied to shear frames with uncertain stiffness properties, Computers & Structures Volume: 67, Issue: 1–3, April 1, 1998, pp. 91–98
 D. Moens and D. Vandepitte, Interval sensitivity theory and its application to frequency response envelope analysis of uncertain structures. Computer Methods in Applied Mechanics and Engineering Vol. 196, No. 21-24,1 April 2007, pp. 2486–2496.
 Möller, B., Beer, M., Fuzzy Randomness - Uncertainty in Civil Engineering and Computational Mechanics, Springer, Berlin, 2004.
 E. Popova, R. Iankov, Z. Bonev: Bounding the Response of Mechanical Structures with Uncertainties in all the Parameters. In R.L.Muhannah, R.L.Mullen (Eds): Proceedings of the NSF Workshop on Reliable Engineering Computing (REC), Svannah, Georgia USA, Feb. 22–24, 2006, 245-265
 A. Pownuk, Numerical solutions of fuzzy partial differential equation and its application in computational mechanics, Fuzzy Partial Differential Equations and Relational Equations: Reservoir Characterization and Modeling (M. Nikravesh, L. Zadeh and V. Korotkikh, eds.), Studies in Fuzziness and Soft Computing, Physica-Verlag, 2004, pp. 308–347
 A. Pownuk, Efficient Method of Solution of Large Scale Engineering Problems with Interval Parameters Based on Sensitivity Analysis, Proceeding of NSF workshop on Reliable Engineering Computing, September 15–17, 2004, Savannah, Georgia, USA, pp. 305–316
M.V. Rama Rao, A. Pownuk and I. Skalna, Stress Analysis of a Singly Reinforced Concrete Beam with Uncertain Structural Parameters, NSF workshop on Reliable Engineering Computing, February 20–22, 2008, Savannah, Georgia, USA, pp. 459–478
 Bernardini, Alberto, Tonon, Fulvio, Bounding Uncertainty in Civil Engineering, Springer 2010
 Ben-Haim Y., Elishakoff I., 1990, Convex Models of Uncertainty in Applied Mechanics. Elsevier Science Publishers, New York
 Valliappan S., Pham T.D., 1993, Fuzzy Finite Element Analysis of A Foundation on Elastic Soil Medium. International Journal for Numerical and Analytical Methods in Geomechanics, Vol.17, pp. 771–789
 Elishakoff I., Li Y.W., Starnes J.H., 1994, A deterministic method to predict the effect of unknown-but-bounded elastic moduli on the buckling of composite structures. Computer methods in applied mechanics and engineering, Vol.111, pp. 155–167
 Valliappan S. Pham T.D., 1995, Elasto-Plastic Finite Element Analysis with Fuzzy Parameters. International Journal for Numerical Methods in Engineering, 38, pp. 531–548
 Rao S.S., Sawyer J.P., 1995, Fuzzy Finite Element Approach for the Analysis of Imprecisly Defined Systems. AIAA Journal, Vol.33, No.12, pp. 2364–2370
 Köylüoglu H.U., Cakmak A., Nielsen S.R.K., 1995, Interval mapping in structural mechanics. In: Spanos, ed. Computational Stochastic Mechanics. 125–133. Balkema, Rotterdam
 Muhanna, R. L. and R. L. Mullen (1995). "Development of Interval Based Methods for Fuzziness in Continuum Mechanics" in Proceedings of the 3rd International Symposium on Uncertainty Modeling and Analysis and Annual Conference of the North American Fuzzy Information Processing Society (ISUMA–NAFIPS'95),IEEE, 705–710

External links 
 Reliable Engineering Computing, Georgia Institute of Technology, Savannah, USA
 Interval Computations
 Reliable Computing (Journal)
 Interval equations (collections of references)
 Interval finite element web applications
 E. Popova, Parametric Solution Set of Interval Linear System
 The Society for Imprecise Probability: Theories and Applications

Finite element method